Virgilio Palomo (born 28 May 1956) is a Colombian boxer. He competed in the men's flyweight event at the 1976 Summer Olympics. At the 1976 Summer Olympics, he lost in his first fight to Toshinori Koga of Japan.

References

1956 births
Living people
Colombian male boxers
Olympic boxers of Colombia
Boxers at the 1976 Summer Olympics
Place of birth missing (living people)
Flyweight boxers
20th-century Colombian people